Pratik Prakashbapu Patil (born 9 August 1973) is an Indian member of the 15th Lok Sabha of India. He is son of former Loksabha member Prakash-bapu Patil & also grandson of former chief minister of maharashtra Padmabhushan Vasantdada Patil. He represented the Sangli constituency of Maharashtra and is a member of the Indian National Congress (INC) political party. He is held  a position in the Indian Federal Government as the Union Minister of State for Coal.

He was also a member of the 14th Lok Sabha from Sangli, Maharashtra after he won the bypoll held due to death of his father Prakashbapu Patil.

External links

Living people
Indian National Congress politicians
People from Sangli district
India MPs 2009–2014
India MPs 2004–2009
Marathi politicians
Union Ministers from Maharashtra
1973 births
Lok Sabha members from Maharashtra
Indian National Congress politicians from Maharashtra